The sinus venosus is a large quadrangular cavity which precedes the atrium on the venous side of the chordate heart.

In mammals, the sinus venosus exists distinctly only in the embryonic heart where it is found between the two venae cavae; in the adult, the sinus venosus becomes incorporated into the wall of the right atrium to form a smooth part called the sinus venarum which is separated from the rest of the atrium by a ridge called the crista terminalis. In most mammals, the sinus venosus also forms the sinoatrial node and the coronary sinus.

Development 
In the embryo, the thin walls of the sinus venosus are connected below with the right ventricle, and medially with the left atrium, but are free in the rest of their extent. It receives blood from the vitelline vein, umbilical vein and common cardinal vein.

The sinus venosus originally starts as a paired structure but shifts towards associating only with the right atrium as the embryonic heart develops. The left portion shrinks in size and eventually forms the coronary sinus (right atrium) and oblique vein of the left atrium, whereas the right part becomes incorporated into the right atrium to form the sinus venarum.

Additional images

See also
Atrial septal defect
Bulbus cordis
Ducts of Cuvier
Primitive ventricle
Primitive atrium
Ductus venosus
Truncus arteriosus
Sinus venosus atrial septal defect

References

External links
  - Gross anatomy of the adult heart
  - "Right atrium, internal structure, anterior view"

Embryology of cardiovascular system

de:Sinus venosus
zh:静脉窦